In enzymology, a Cl-transporting ATPase is an enzyme that catalyzes the chemical reaction

ATP + H2O + Cl−out  ADP + phosphate + Cl−in

The 3 substrates of this enzyme are ATP, H2O, and Cl−, whereas its 3 products are ADP, phosphate, and Cl−.

This enzyme belongs to the family of hydrolases, specifically those acting on acid anhydrides to catalyse transmembrane movement of substances. The systematic name of this enzyme class is ATP phosphohydrolase (Cl−-importing). Other names in common use include Cl−-translocating ATPase, and Cl−-motive ATPase.

References

 
 
 

EC 3.6.3
Enzymes of unknown structure